Woronora Dam is a locality split between City of Wollongong, City of Campbelltown, and Sutherland Shire in New South Wales, Australia.

Geography 
The dam of the same name is located within the locality as is Lake Woronora, the reservoir created by the dam.

References

External links

Suburbs of Sydney
Sutherland Shire
City of Wollongong
City of Campbelltown (New South Wales)